Carson, Rachel, House may refer to:

 Rachel Carson House (Colesville, Maryland), where Rachel Carson wrote Silent Spring, listed on the U.S. National Register of Historic Places (NRHP)
 Rachel Carson Homestead, Rachel Carson's birthplace and childhood home in Springdale, Pennsylvania, also listed on the NRHP as Rachel Carson House